Chokkanatha Nayak (1662—1682) succeeded his father Muttu Alkadri Nayak, as the ruler of the Madurai Nayak dynasty, when he was sixteen years old.

References

Madurai Nayak dynasty
Telugu people
Telugu monarchs